The Bembine Tablet, the Bembine Table of Isis or the Mensa Isiaca (Isiac Tablet) is an elaborate tablet of bronze with enamel and silver inlay, most probably of Roman origin but imitating the ancient Egyptian style. It was named in the Renaissance after Cardinal Bembo, a celebrated antiquarian who acquired it after the 1527 sack of Rome. Thereafter it was used by antiquarians to penetrate the meaning of Egyptian hieroglyphs, which were not authentically deciphered until the 19th century. Owing to these prior misconceptions, the tablet became of importance to western esoteric traditions.

Origin and construction
The Tablet is now regarded as of Roman rather than Egyptian origin, dating to some time in the first century CE. Little is known of its subsequent history until after the sack of Rome in 1527, when Cardinal Bembo acquired it from a certain locksmith or ironworker into whose hands it had fallen. After Bembo's death in 1547, the Tablet was acquired by the Gonzaga rulers of Mantua, remaining in their museum until the capture of the city in 1630 by Ferdinand II's troops. It then passed through various hands until the French conquest of Italy in 1797. Alexandre Lenoir mentioned in 1809 that it was on exhibition in the Bibliothèque Nationale. After Napoleon's downfall it was returned to Italy to become a central exhibit in what is now the Museo Egizio at Turin, where it has remained.

The tablet was made of bronze with enamel and silver inlay, the figures cut very shallow and the contours of most of them delineated with thin silver wire. The bases on which the figures sat were covered with silver, later torn away, and these sections are left blank in the engraved reproduction above. It is an important example of ancient metallurgy, its surface being decorated with a variety of metals including silver, gold, copper-gold alloy and various base metals. One of the metals employed is black, made by alloying copper and tin with small amounts of gold and silver, and then "pickling" it in organic acid. This black metal is possibly a variety of the "Corinthian bronze" described by Pliny and Plutarch.

Interpretations

Although the scenes are Egyptianising, they do not depict Egyptian rites. Figures are shown with non-customary attributes, making it unclear which are divinities and which kings or queens. Egyptian motifs are used without rhyme or reason. However, the central figure is recognisable as Isis, suggesting that the Tablet originated in some Roman centre of her worship.

One of the earliest scholars to study the tablet was Pierio Valeriano Bolzani, who may have seen it before it became generally known after the sack of 1527. His Hieroglyphica sive de sacris Aegyptiorum litteris commentarii seems to have been composed earlier than that, although it was published much later. The work covered the whole field of the meaning of hieroglyphics, but lacked the scholarly rigour of the antiquarian Laurentius Pignorius (1571–1631), whose Characteres Aegyptii, hoc est Sacrorum, quibus Aegyptii utuntur, simulachrorum accurata delineatio et explicatio of 1608 investigates the origin of the tablet as an archaeological object. Avoiding interpretation of the meaning, the author expressed doubt as to whether the images  were at all meaningful, in which he was subsequently proven right.

Later in the 17th century, the Jesuit scholar Athanasius Kircher in Oedipus Aegyptiacus (1652) used the tablet as a primary source for developing his translations of hieroglyphics, which are now known to be incorrect. His book was the source for the English physician and philosopher Sir Thomas Browne, who, in his discourse The Garden of Cyrus (1658) alludes to "the figures of Isis and Osyris, and the Tutelary spirits in the Bembine Table". Seventeenth century scholars of comparative religion such as Kircher and Browne attempted to reconcile the wisdom of antiquity with Christianity, the Bembine Tablet was interpreted as a vehicle for such syncretic thought; thus Browne proposes in his discourse: 

"Though he that considereth........ the crosse erected upon a pitcher diffusing streams of water into two basins, with sprinkling branches in them, and all described upon a two-footed altar, as in the Hieroglyphicks of the brazen Table of Bembus will hardly decline all thought of Christian signality in them." 
  
Kircher's speculations were used by several occultists, including Eliphas Levi, William Wynn Westcott and Manly P. Hall, as a key to interpreting the "Book of Thoth" or Tarot. Platonistic writer Thomas Taylor even claimed that this tablet formed the altar before which Plato stood as he received initiation within a subterranean hall in the Great Pyramid of Giza.

According to modern scholarly consensus, the Mensa Isiaca was made in the second half of the first century CE in Rome, perhaps as a decorative piece for the local Isis cult. The artist, who did not understand hieroglyphs at all, seems to have used parts of a real Greco-Roman period text; by changing signs and garbling sections of the text, this resulted in an incomprehensible, purely decorative piece, of which only a few sign groups can be recognized.

Notes

1st-century inscriptions
1527 archaeological discoveries
Esotericism
Museo Egizio
Great Pyramid of Giza
Steles
Bronze objects
Isis
Roman Empire art